Estoy Aquí (I'm Here) is a studio album by Lalo Rodríguez released in 1996. It is the final studio album released by Rodríguez, as his album Con Todo Mi Corazon, originally set to be released in March 2013, was completed but never publicly released.

Track listing

References

1996 albums
Lalo Rodríguez albums